The Portland Saturday Market is an outdoor arts and crafts market in Portland, Oregon.  It is the largest continuously operated outdoor market in the United States.  It is held every Saturday and Sunday from the beginning of March through December 24, in Tom McCall Waterfront Park underneath Burnside Bridge and south of the bridge, as well as within an adjacent plaza just across Naito Parkway, extending west to the Skidmore Fountain. The market's hours of operations are from 10 a.m. to 5 p.m. on Saturdays, and 11 a.m. to 4:30 p.m on Sundays, and admission is free.  The market is accessible by foot, bicycle, Segway, and TriMet's MAX Light Rail line which stops near the market at the Skidmore Fountain stop. The market has over 400 members and generates an estimated $12 million in gross sales annually. It has become a central economic engine for the historic Old Town Chinatown neighborhood, and attracts an estimated 750,000 visitors to this area each year.

History

The market was founded in 1974 by craftspeople Sheri Teasdale and Andrea Scharf, who modeled it after the Saturday Market in Eugene, Oregon.  It was founded as a mutual benefit corporation, under which all members would share in the cost and governance of the market, yet keep all profits they receive from selling their items.  All items sold at the Saturday Market are required to be handmade by the person selling it, and a committee of members judge each new item against a minimum standard of quality.

Sock It To Me, a sock and apparel company based out of Portland, started at the Saturday Market.

Location
The group did not have a location for the market, until Bill Naito offered them a parking lot known as the "Butterfly lot".  A large butterfly mural hangs over the market today commemorating the past.  For the first year that the market operated, there was no specific site plan. A board of directors was established and the first chair was Scott Nay who worked in the Human Resources Department in the city of Portland.  He was instrumental in hiring the first market manager Dana Comfort who along with a well chosen staff began to organize the site by and under the Burnside Bridge. A clear site plan was eventually created, marking out  booth spaces, defining aisles and a pattern for customer traffic.  In 1976, the market moved to a site under the Burnside Bridge between First Avenue and Front Avenue (now Naito Parkway), where it then remained for the next 33 years.  It began operating on Sundays in 1977.

Relocation in 2009

In April 2005, the Portland Development Commission and Portland Saturday Market began a study of potential sites that serve as a permanent location for the Saturday Market. Although the market had already been operating for three decades, it had always existed on a patchwork of short-term leases with private property owners, providing little or no long-term certainty.  That situation was viewed as a disincentive to capital investment, due to a lack of mid-week activities on the site, and as reinforcing adverse social conditions, creating an unsafe area within the neighborhood along with the additional burden of weekly cleaning of the site before Market use.  The long-range major goals for the Market included: a permanent location, improved infrastructure, and more protection from the weather, needing to be met in a cost efficient manner. In October 2005, the city launched its own study,  called the "Ankeny/Burnside Development Framework Project", to assess the opportunities for the area and how best to direct public funding to increase private investment.

The recommendations from these studies eventually led to a plan which would move the market out of the space under the Burnside Bridge at First Avenue, to a new space one block east, in Tom McCall Waterfront Park, and include construction of an open-side shelter (called a "pavilion" by market representatives) to provide 8,000 square feet of semi-weather-protected space immediately south of the bridge. Ankeny Square, the small plaza located between the Skidmore Fountain and Naito Parkway, would continue to be used for vendor booths each weekend, in addition to the larger space to the east of Naito Parkway, within the park.  The move would increase the number of craft-vendor spaces slightly, from 255 to 275. The intention was that Waterfront Park would lease the pavilion to the market on the weekends during the market season, while also leasing the area for other projects during the week.  The project was overseen by the Portland Development Commission, who had recently concluded a three-year study on possible permanent locations.  Also under the project's umbrella was an accommodation for the headquarters of Mercy Corps. At the beginning of the 2009 season, the new space was not ready for use, so the market opened temporarily at its old location.

In May 2009, Saturday Market moved into its new location in Waterfront Park. Ankeny Plaza, a relatively small portion of the market, was retained as part of the reconfigured market, and is used by about 50 vendors each weekend. In August 2009, a new public fountain was brought into use next to the market's space, in the park at Ash Street, named the Bill Naito Legacy Fountain in honor of Portland businessman and civic leader Bill Naito, who had also been one of the Saturday Market's early supporters.

References

External links

 Official website

Culture of Portland, Oregon
Economy of Portland, Oregon
Busking venues
Tourist attractions in Portland, Oregon
Old Town Chinatown
1974 establishments in Oregon
Southwest Portland, Oregon
Tom McCall Waterfront Park